Hug of Thunder is the fifth studio album by Canadian indie rock musical collective Broken Social Scene. It was released by the Arts & Crafts record label on July 7, 2017.

Background
After declaring a hiatus in September 2011, Broken Social Scene performed at the Field Trip Arts & Crafts Music Festival in 2013 and played a few other festivals in 2015, which prompted band members Kevin Drew, Brendan Canning, Charles Spearin, Justin Peroff, and Andrew Whiteman to discuss recording new material. "When we're working, we understand that there will be a lot more input, so we leave space in the music as we're writing it," Spearin said. "We would send out invitations for all the usual crew, and say, 'Hey, we're doing this again. Would you be interested in being part of this?'" In the end, eighteen musicians were credited on Hug of Thunder. During sessions for the album, Feist conceived the idea for the title track, her first lead vocal on a Broken Social Scene song since 2006. Drew explained that the title represents "exactly who we are. That is our show. We're trying to create that hug of thunder. That sound. That embrace amongst the chaos."

Reception

Hug of Thunder received positive reviews from music critics. At Metacritic, which assigns a normalized rating out of 100 to reviews from mainstream critics, the album received an average score of 76, based on 30 reviews.

Accolades

Track listing

Personnel
Musicians
 Ohad Benchetrit – slide guitar , electric guitar 
 Brendan Canning – bass guitar , background vocals , synth , electric guitar , bass synth , piano , acoustic guitar , guitar loops , lead vocals , vocals 
 Joe Chiccarelli – drum programming 
 Evan Cranley – trombone , electric guitar 
 Kevin Drew – background vocals , lead vocals , vocals , acoustic guitar , electric guitar , piano , drums , percussion , bass synth , electronic drums , beat box , sound effects , synth , B3 organ , bass guitar , Nord strings , Rhodes , keyboard 
 Ariel Engle – background vocals , lead vocals , vocals 
 Shawn Everett – background vocals, synth 
  Feist - background vocals , vocals , lead vocals , Baldwin keys , organ 
 David French – saxophone , flute 
 Sam Goldberg – keytar , electric guitar 
 Emily Haines – background vocals , lead vocals , vocals 
 Julia Hambleton – clarinet 
 Lisa Lobsinger – vocals 
 Dave Manelin – vocals 
 Roger Manning – vocoder 
 Amy Millan – background vocals , vocals 
 Julie Penner – violin 
 Justin Peroff – drums , percussion 
 Jimmy Shaw – trumpet 
 Charles Spearin - electric guitar , nyckelharpa , Hammertone guitar , synth , bass synth , background vocals , air spray percussion , Melotron guitar , drum machine , Farfisa organ , slide guitar , B3 organ , trumpet  
 Nyles Spencer – sampler , bass synth   
 Andrew Whiteman – electric guitar , synth , vocals , drum machine , acoustic guitar , fuzz bass , background vocals , tres guitar , bass synth 

Technical
 Joe Chiccarelli – production
 Nyles Spencer – production
 Shawn Everett – mixing
 Emily Lazar – mastering
 Chris Allgood – mastering assistance

Charts

References

2017 albums
Arts & Crafts Productions albums
Broken Social Scene albums